{{Infobox film
| name           = Pithamaha
| image          = 
| caption        = 
| director       = K. S. L. Swamy
| writer         = Subhash Ghai
| based_on       = Hindi film Vidhaata
| starring       = RajeshUdaykumarV. RavichandranJai JagadishVijayalakshmi Singh
| producer       = Sangram SinghJairam Singh
| music          = M. Ranga Rao
| cinematography = D. V. Rajaram
| editing        = V. P. Krishnan
| studio         = Singh Brothers
| released       = 
| runtime        = 134 minutes
| language       = Kannada
| country        = India
| budget         = 
}}Pithamaha is a 1985 Indian Kannada-language film, directed by K. S. L. Swamy (Ravi) and produced by Singh Brothers. The film stars Rajesh, Udaykumar, V. Ravichandran and Vijayalakshmi Singh. While M. Ranga Rao composed the music, the lyrics and dialogues were written by Chi. Udaya Shankar.

The film was a remake of the 1982 Hindi film Vidhaata''.

Cast 
 Rajesh
 Udaykumar
 V. Ravichandran
 Vijayalakshmi Singh
 Sundar Krishna Urs
 Jai Jagadish
 Dheerendra Gopal
 Thoogudeepa Srinivas
 Mysore Lokesh
 Bank Janardhan
 Keerthi Raj
 Ashwath Narayan

Soundtrack 
The music was composed by M. Ranga Rao, with lyrics by Chi. Udaya Shankar. All the songs composed for the film were received well, especially "Mareyadiru Aa Shaktiya" is considered an evergreen song.

References 

1985 films
1980s Kannada-language films
Indian drama films
Films scored by M. Ranga Rao
Kannada remakes of Hindi films
Films directed by K. S. L. Swamy